Rankin Park is a suburb of Newcastle, New South Wales, Australia, located  west of Newcastle's central business district. It is split between the City of Lake Macquarie and City of Newcastle local government areas.

The Aboriginal people, in this area, the Awabakal, were the first people of this land.

The suburb began as a housing estate named Cambridge Hills Estate. The local preschool on McCaffrey Drive, formerly a sales office for the estate, retains the former estate's name.

The east of the suburb contains George McGregor Park, a  bushland reserve named after the late, former South Wallsend Progress Association member, George McGregor, is managed by the City of Newcastle.

References

External links
 History of Rankin Park
 

Suburbs of Lake Macquarie
Suburbs of Newcastle, New South Wales